The Men's individual table tennis – Class 4 tournament at the 2020 Summer Paralympics in Tokyo took place between 25 and 30 August 2021 at Tokyo Metropolitan Gymnasium. Classes 1–5 were for athletes with a physical impairment that affected their legs, and who competed in a sitting position. The lower the number, the greater the impact the impairment was on an athlete's ability to compete.

In the preliminary stage, athletes competed in seven groups of three. Winners and runners-up of each group qualified for the knock-out stage. In this edition of the Games, no bronze medal match was held. Losers of each semifinal were automatically awarded a bronze medal.

Results
All times are local time in UTC+9.

Preliminary round
The first two matches were played on 25 August, and the third on 26 August.

Group A

Group B

Group C

Group D

Group E

Group F

Knockout stage

References

Men's individual - Class 4